Daravizeh (also Romanized as Darāvīzeh; also known as Dar Āvīz) is a village in Mollasani Rural District, in the Central District of Bavi County, Khuzestan Province, Iran. At the 2006 census, its population was 230, in 45 families.

References 

Populated places in Bavi County